Johannes Kahrs (born 4 January 1965 in Bremen, West Germany) is an artist based in Berlin.

He studied at Hochschule der Künste in Berlin in 1994. Kahrs has shown work internationally in exhibitions including the 2002 Taipei Biennale, Manifesta 5 in San Sebastian, In/Site/Out at Apex in New York, the 1998 Berlin Biennale and Down’n Out at Zeno X Gallery in Antwerp. In 2008 he had a showing at the Luhring Augustine Gallery in New York City.

Awards
 2000: Dorothea von Stetten Art Award

References

External links
Johannes Kahrs at Luhring Augustine
Johannes Kahrs at Saatchi Gallery
Johannes Kahrs at Parasol unit foundation for contemporary art

1965 births
Living people
German contemporary artists